Columbia Point, in the Dorchester neighborhood of Boston, Massachusetts sits on a peninsula jutting out from the mainland of eastern Dorchester into the bay.  Old Harbor Park is on the north side, adjacent to Old Harbor, part of Dorchester Bay.  The peninsula is primarily occupied by Harbor Point, the University of Massachusetts Boston, the John F. Kennedy Presidential Library and Museum, the Edward M. Kennedy Institute for the United States Senate, and a complex at the former Bayside Expo Center, Boston College High School, and the Massachusetts Archives.  The Boston Harborwalk follows the entire coastline.

History

17th–19th centuries

In Dorchester, Columbia Point was the landing place for Puritan settlers in the early 1600s. The Native Americans called it "Mattaponnock".

The community was, in the 17th and 18th centuries, and through to the mid-19th century, a calf pasture: a place where nearby Dorchester residents took their calves for grazing. It was largely an uninhabited marshland on the Dorchester peninsula. Its size was originally .

In 1845, the Old Colony Railroad ran through the area and connected Boston and Plymouth, Massachusetts. The station was originally called Crescent Avenue or Crescent Avenue Depot as an Old Colony Railroad station, then called Columbia until December 1, 1982, and then again changed to JFK/UMass. It is an MBTA rail line station for both the subway and commuter rail line.

In the 1880s, the calf pasture was used as a Boston sewer line and pumping station, known as the Calf Pasture Pumping Station Complex. This large pumping station still stands and in its time was a model for treating sewage and helping to promote cleaner and healthier urban living conditions. It pumped waste to a remote treatment facility on Moon Island in Boston Harbor, and served as a model for other systems worldwide. This system remained in active use and was the Boston Sewer system's headworks, handling all of the city's sewage, until 1968 when a new treatment facility was built on Deer Island. The pumping station is also architecturally significant as a Richardsonian Romanesque designed by the then Boston city architect, George Clough. It is also the only remaining 19th century building on Columbia Point and is in the National Register of Historic Places.

1900s–50s

Land-filling had caused the creation of Columbus Park on the peninsula and what was then called “Day Boulevard”, now Morrissey Boulevard, by 1934. There was a huge trash dump on the peninsula which turned into more landfill for other use.

During World War II, small barracks were built on this landfill for some prisoners of war. After the war, these were re-used for the Columbia Point Veterans Village. Also, in 1950, Boston College High School relocated from the South End of Boston to its present home on Morrissey Boulevard.

More landfill on the north shore of the peninsula had been created to build the Columbia Point Development housing projects which were the largest in Boston and New England and built by the Boston Housing Authority. The area was now known as Columbia Point. The Columbia Point Development was completed in 1954 and had 1,500 apartments in 27 nearly identical three- and seven-story buildings. When the Columbia Point public housing project opened in 1953, its initial demographics reflected that of the city's population: white tenants made up more than 90 percent of the population while black families made up approximately 7 percent. All reports at the time indicated that racial and ethnic tensions were minimal, that there were high levels of social trust within the neighborhood, and by 1955, had a long waiting list of families wanting to become new tenants. Other infrastructure was added, including public schools. The MBTA rapid transit stop was called Columbia, later to be known as the JFK/UMass stop on the Red Line.

1960s

In the 1960s, there was a movement of community residents from the Columbia Point housing projects to get the city dump, which was located on the peninsula, permanently closed. They were able to get attorney F. Lee Bailey interested and to represent them. Eventually, the city dump closed in 1962 and the private dump, called Mile Road Dump, was ordered closed in February 1963 by the Massachusetts Supreme Court. Under the tenure of Boston Mayor John F. Collins (1960–1968), the Boston Housing Authority segregated the public housing developments in the city of Boston by moving black families into the development at Columbia Point while reserving developments in South Boston (such as West Broadway Housing Development) for white families who started refusing assignment to the Columbia Point project by the early 1960s.

In 1965, the first community health center in the United States was built on Columbia Point, the Columbia Point Community Health Center, and was founded by two Tufts University medical doctors, Jack Geiger and Count Gibson. Geiger had previously studied the first community health centers and the principles of Community Oriented Primary Care with Sidney Kark  and colleagues while serving as a medical student in rural Natal, South Africa. The health center was funded by the federal government's Office of Economic Opportunity (OEO) and was needed to serve the community living in the Columbia Point Public Housing Projects which was on the isolated peninsula far away from Boston City Hospital. The center still stands and is in use today as the Geiger-Gibson Community Health Center on Mount Vernon Street. In 2012, due to shifting demographics, Geiger-Gibson Community Health Center reduced its primary care hours and focus, moving its primary care patients to the Neponset Health Center in the Neponset neighborhood of Dorchester.Sheehan, Daniel, "Health Community Offers Final Salutes to Dr. Geiger", Dorchester Reporter, January 7, 2021.

1970s–80s

In 1974, the University of Massachusetts Boston campus was opened on the tip of Columbia Point, and called the Harbor Campus.

In 1977, after an unsuccessful bid to have the John F. Kennedy Library in Cambridge, Massachusetts close to Harvard University, ground was broken at the tip of Columbia Point for the John F. Kennedy Presidential Library and Museum, designed by the architect I. M. Pei, and dedicated on October 20, 1979.

The Columbia Point Housing Projects fell into disrepair and became quite dangerous. By the mid-1970s the Boston Housing Authority was under community, political, and legal pressure and orders to renovate and cure the living conditions at the site. By the 1980s only 300 families lived there and the buildings had been allowed to fall into decline. 

Lacking the federal, state, and local government investment required to renovate Columbia Point while maintaining the deep affordability attached to public housing, the Boston Housing Authority and City of Boston made the decision to turn the property over to a private company to redevelop the area into a luxury, market-rate apartment complex with a portion of the units set aside as subsidized privately owned units. In 1984, the firm Corcoran-Mullins-Jennison was given control of the management, planning, demolition and renovation for the Columbia Point Housing Projects. A 99-year lease from the city of Boston was granted to and co-owned by the (Harbor Point Apartments, L.P.) Harbor Point Community Task Force (tenants' elected board) and a partnership of developers led by Corcoran-Mullins-Jennison Corporation. Construction on the new Harbor Point development began in 1986. During a recession in 1988 with a slump in the housing market, deficits and expensive loans ($175 million in state and federal loans), the Harbor Point development came close to bankruptcy. Chevron Corporation rescued the redevelopment by investing $34 million, with Chevron taking advantage of $38 million in corporate tax credits and depreciation established by Congress in 1986 encouraging private investment in low-income housing. The renovations to the newly mixed-income complex, renamed Harbor Point Apartments, were completed in 1990 with 1200 apartments: 800 market-rate and 400 subsidized (compared to the previous 1,500 units public housing units). It has received praise for its planning and revitalization from the Urban Land Institute, the FIABCI award, a gold medal with the Rudy Bruner Award for Urban Excellence in 1993, and was used as a model for the federal HUD HOPE VI public housing demolition and redevelopment program begun in 1992.

Two Boston architects were instrumental in the redesign of Columbia Point Housing Projects into the new and upscale Harbor Point Apartments: Joan E. Goody and Samuel "Sy" Mintz. Goody was interested in putting townhouses on the property whereas Mintz worked on re-vitalizing and re-making the existing buildings and their footprints."Architect who helped transform Harbor Point looks to do the same for Bunker Hill project - but this time as a volunteer", Universal Hub / Charlestown Patriot-Bridge, Fri, 03/10/2017

2000s

In 2008, plans and proposals were unveiled and presented to public community hearings by the Corcoran-Jennison Company to redevelop the  Bayside Exposition Center site on the Columbia Point peninsula into a mixed use village of storefronts and residences, called "Bayside on the Point". There were serious problems with the ongoing development plans, since the Massachusetts Water Resources Authority had planned to build a sewage odor control facility just adjacent to the development site.

However, in 2009, the Bayside Expo Center property was lost in a foreclosure on Corcoran-Jennison to a Florida-based real estate firm, LNR/CMAT, who bought it. Soon after, the University of Massachusetts Boston bought the property from them to build future campus facilities. In February 2010, The University of Massachusetts Boston in conjunction with the University of Massachusetts Building Authority formally signed the purchase papers and bought the Bayside Expo property for $18.7 million. In 2010, the university plans to break ground and start building a new science laboratory and other facilities.

In late 2012, a developer, Synergy Investments, announced plans to put up a residential building at 25 Morrissey Blvd. right next to the JFK/UMass train stop, on an abandoned lot, to further develop the foot of the Columbia Point peninsula. Also, in 2012, developer Corcoran-Jennison Companies announced plans to build another residential building on Mt. Vernon Street on the site of the office complex next to the former Bayside Expo.

In 2014, the Boston Redevelopment Authority began a study on redeveloping the main road on Columbia Point, Mount Vernon Street, in conjunction with the Master Plan for the peninsula.

On March 30, 2015 the Edward M. Kennedy Institute for the United States Senate was dedicated by President Barack Obama, with Vice President Joe Biden in attendance. The Institute has been open to the public since March 31, 2015.

In 2018, discussions opened up as to what to do with the two Boston Public schools on Columbia Point: Dever Elementary School, which was in receivership, and the McCormack Middle School. There were plans for a high school to be placed there.

In Fall 2018, UMASS/Boston opened up two new high-rise student dormitory buildings on the campus next to the Athletic Complex. These were the first on-campus dormitories built at UMASS/Boston.

In 2019, The Bayside Expo site now leveled and owned by UMASS/Boston is leased out for 99 years for development to Accordia Partners for $235 million.

In October 2018, Boston Mayor Marty Walsh announced a comprehensive climate change adaptation proposal to protect the Boston Harbor coastline from coastal flooding, and in October 2020, the Walsh administration released a 174-page climate change adaptation report for the Boston Harbor coastline in Dorchester with a section on Columbia Point and Morrissey Boulevard. In March 2022, the Boston Planning & Development Agency (BPDA) approved a proposal by the Dorchester Boys & Girls Club and the Martin Richard Foundation to construct a 3-story field house on Mount Vernon Street.

Timeline 
Source: Lawton, University of Massachusetts Boston, research materials
 1630 – Puritan settlers land on Columbia Point. The site is used as a calf pasture for the town of Dorchester until 1869
 1884 – The Sewage pumping station opens at the end of Mile Road.
 1942 – Camp McKay, used to house Italian prisoners during World War II, is built on the north side of the peninsula.
 1954 – Columbia Point housing project opens and the first tenants move in.
 1965 – The Columbia Point Health Center, the first community health center in the country, opens.
 1966 – Construction of the Bayside Mall begins.
 1971 – Construction of University of Massachusetts Boston begins.
 1974 – The Harbor Campus of the University of Massachusetts Boston, opens on Columbia Point.
 1975 – Tenants at several public housing projects file suit against the Boston Housing Authority, complaining of sub-standard living conditions.
 1978 – The Boston Redevelopment Authority receives a $10 million federal grant for improvements at the Columbia Point housing project.
 1979 – The Boston Housing Authority is placed in receivership by the courts.
 1979 – The John F. Kennedy Presidential Library and Museum is formally dedicated.
 1984 – The Boston Housing Authority’s receivership ends and Corcoran, Mullins, Jennison, a private development company, takes over the management of Columbia Point, initiating a major cleanup and intensive maintenance improvements.
 1985 – The Massachusetts State Archives opens in November.
 1986 – The construction of the new Harbor Point housing complex, a mixed-income community, on the site of the former Columbia Point housing projects, begins.
 1998 – Harbor Point Apartments achieves a 99% occupancy rate and celebrates its tenth anniversary.
 2008 – A proposal for the re-development of the Bayside Exposition Center site into a mixed residential and commercial property to be called "Bayside on the Point" was offered for public perusal.
 2009 – The Bayside Exposition Center site is lost in a foreclosure and eventually sold to the University of Massachusetts Boston.
 2010 – The University of Massachusetts Boston formally buys the Bayside Expo property for $18.7 million in February 2010
 2015 – The Edward M. Kennedy Institute for the United States Senate opened to the public in March.
 2018 - Two student dormitory buildings are opened for UMASS/Boston on the peninsula
 2019 - The Bayside Expo site owned by UMASS/Boston is leased out for 99 years for development to Accordia Partners for $235 million

References

Notes

Bibliography 

 "Urban Transformations: Columbia Point - Harbor Point, Boston" 
 Ball, Joanne, "Can Columbia Point Be Harbor Point? Conversion Represents A Test Of Social Engineering", The Boston Globe, August 14, 1988
 Boston Society of Architects, Goody, Joan E., Chair, &al.,"Columbia Point, a new vision", c.1991. Collection of Boston Public Library.
 Bressi, Todd, "From the Outside Looking In: An Evaluation of Harbor Point", Places journal, v.8, no.4, Summer 1993, College of Environmental Design, UC Berkeley
 Diesenhouse, Susan, "Community Rises From Boston Slum", The New York Times, November 15, 1987
 Goody, Joan E., "From Project to Community: The Redesign of Columbia Point", Places journal, v.8, no.4, Summer 1993, College of Environmental Design, UC Berkeley
 Higgins, Richard, "As Columbia Point Is Reborn, Nuns Face Displacement Battle", The Boston Globe, July 23, 1988
 Kamin, Blair, "Rethinking Public Housing", Blueprints magazine, v.15, n.3, Summer 1997 issue, National Building Museum, Washington, D.C.
 Lawton, Heather Block, Research Materials for the book "A Decent Place to Live: from Columbia Point to Harbor Point", University of Massachusetts, Boston, September 2001. (archived 2006)
 Marwell, Stuart; Burke, Bryan; Hudak, Andrew, "Calf Pasture Pumping Station", Boston Public Library, BRA (Boston Redevelopment Authority) collection
 Millson, Rebecca Michelle; Spirn, Anne Whiston, MIT 4.211 course on "The Once and Future City", focusing on Harbor Point/Columbia Point, Spring 2007. (archived 2007)
 Pader, Ellen J; Breitbart, Myrna Margulies, "Transforming Public Housing: Conflicting Visions for Harbor Point", Places journal, v.8, no.4, Summer 1993, College of Environmental Design, UC Berkeley
 Roessner, Jane. "A Decent Place to Live: from Columbia Point to Harbor Point - A Community History", Boston: Northeastern University Press, c2000. 
 Excerpts from the book "A Decent Place to Live"
 Rybczynski, Witold, "Radical Revival: Harbor Point was failed public housing—until it was rebuilt as the nation's first mixed-income community. Twenty-five years later, what can we learn from this visionary project?", ARCHITECT: The Magazine of the American Institute of Architects,  American Institute of Architects, August 16, 2013
 Silverstein, Nina M.; Conahan, Judith M., &al., "Aging in Place at Harbor Point: Outreach Follow-Up of Older Adults Living in Independent Mixed-Income Apartments", Gerontology Institute and College of Public and Community Service, University of Massachusetts Boston, November 2004
 Thebaud, Angie, et al., "Funded Public Housing Redevelopment: A Study of the Transformation of Columbia Point", Boston, Massachusetts, September 2008, Institute for International Urban Development
 Vale, Lawrence J., From the Puritans to the projects: public housing and public neighbors, Harvard University Press, 2000. Cf. especially p.255, 357-8, various on Columbia Point Housing Project history.

External links 

 Map of Columbia Point - Boston Redevelopment Authority, City of Boston (archived 2012)
 "Columbia Point Master Plan" - Boston Redevelopment Authority, City of Boston
 Urban Transformations: Columbia Point - Harbor Point, Boston - presentation slides, Professor David W. Manzo, Boston College (archived 2008)
 1899 Map of Dorchester, Massachusetts with the N.Y. N.H. & H. R.R. running on the Old Colony line - note Mt. Vernon Street and part of Columbia Point in the lower right hand corner (archived 2007)
 Boston 1903 map - see the Calf Pasture on Columbia Point in the lower middle right hand side just above Savin Hill

 
Neighborhoods in Boston
Boston Harbor peninsulas and former islands